Rhizomnium glabrescens, also called fan moss or large leafy moss, is a species of moss in the genus Rhizomnium.

Description
The plants are upright, unbranched and unisexual. Their stems are naked, up to 3 cm high, are shiny and have large leaves. Male plants have large, rose-like clusters of leaves at the tip. Female plants have capsules. It is very common on rotting logs, humus and soil over rocks in low- and middle-elevation forests. Indeed, it is the most common species of leafy moss in low-elevation forests.

References

glabrescens